Shade sandbox is a sandbox-based isolation program developed by Eugene Balabanov. Shade is distributed to consumers as a shareware solution. It creates an isolated virtual environment within your computer: rather than running software and browsing the Internet directly, you can instead perform these actions through a fenced-off safe area. This mechanism creates a highly controlled environment for running untested or untrustworthy apps without threatening host operating system.

Architecture 
Shade sandbox is basically a plugin for an engine, also developed by Eugene Balabanov  which enables developers to build security-related solutions such as file monitors , API Spy utilities and, of course, virtual environments. The platform is available for corporate customers. These are some capabilities the platform provides to plugins:
 Control over file system operations
 Control over registry operations
 A DLL injection mechanism so that plugins could alter processes behavior. For instance, Shade itself exploits this capability to draw a frame over "shaded" application windows

Reception
Findmysoft has rated Shade Sandbox 5 out of 5 stars, naming it Essential 

Softpedia describes Shade as "Simple, yet reliable anti-virus protection"

See also
 Sandbox (computer security)
 Application virtualization
 Deep Freeze
 Sandboxie Plus

References

External links

Windows security software
Windows-only freeware
Utilities for Windows